Daniel Wilson (1680 – 31 May 1754) of Dallam Tower, Westmorland was a British Whig politician who sat in the House of Commons for a total of 34 years between 1708 and 1747.

Wilson was born on 8 March 1680, the son of Edward Wilson of Park House, Leck, Lancashire and his wife Katherine Fleming, daughter of Sir Daniel Fleming of Rydal Hall, Westmorland. He became a Justice of the Peace in 1706.

Wilson was encouraged in his political career, by his uncle Sir William Fleming, 1st Baronet. At the 1708 general election he was elected as Whig Member of Parliament for Westmorland. He was returned unopposed in 1710 and 1713.

Wilson was returned unopposed as MP for Westmorland at the 1715 general election. In 1716, he married Elizabeth Crowle, daughter of William Crowle, merchant, of Hull, Yorkshire.  Then in 1720, his father died and as the eldest surviving son, he inherited the family estate. He did not stand for Parliament at the 1722 general election.  In 1723, he rebuilt Dallam Tower. He was chosen to be High Sheriff of Lancashire for the year 1727 to 1728, and at the 1727 general election resumed his seat in Parliament for Westmorland without opposition. He was returned unopposed again in 1734 but in 1741 there was a contest in which he topped the poll. He stood down at the 1747 general election in favour of his son Edward.

Wilson died on 31 May 1754, leaving four sons and two daughters. His brothers-in-law George Crowle and Richard Crowle were also Members of Parliament.

References

  

  

1680 births
1754 deaths
High Sheriffs of Lancashire
History of Westmorland
Members of the Parliament of Great Britain for English constituencies
People from Milnthorpe
British MPs 1708–1710
British MPs 1710–1713
British MPs 1713–1715
British MPs 1715–1722
British MPs 1727–1734
British MPs 1734–1741